William Bellinger Bulloch (1777 – May 6, 1852) was an American Senator from Georgia, the youngest son of Archibald Bulloch, uncle to James Stephens Bulloch, granduncle to James Dunwoody Bulloch, Martha Bulloch Roosevelt, and Irvine Stephens Bulloch, great-granduncle to President Theodore Roosevelt, Jr. and Elliott Roosevelt, and great-great-granduncle to First Lady of the United States Eleanor Roosevelt.

Biography
Bulloch was born in Savannah, Georgia, the youngest son of Archibald Bulloch. He studied law and was admitted to the bar in Savannah in 1797. In 1804, he was appointed United States district attorney. He was elected as mayor of Savannah in 1812 and alderman in 1814.

During the War of 1812, he served in the Savannah Heavy Artillery, a militia unit charged with defending the Georgia coast.

After the war, he served in a series of political positions in Georgia: solicitor general of the State, collector of customs, Georgia House of Representatives and the Georgia Senate. He was appointed as a Democratic-Republican to the United States Senate to fill the vacancy left by the resignation of William H. Crawford and served from April 8, 1813, until November 6, 1813, when successor William Wyatt Bibb was elected.

Additionally, he was one of the founders of the State Bank of Georgia and served as its president from 1816 to 1843.

He owned a number of slaves. In 1830, he owned 7 slaves. In 1840, he owned 20 slaves. In 1850, he owned 44 slaves.

Bulloch died in Savannah in 1852 and was buried in Laurel Grove Cemetery in that same city.

References

1777 births
1852 deaths
People from Savannah, Georgia
Bulloch family
Democratic-Republican Party United States senators from Georgia (U.S. state)
Georgia (U.S. state) Democratic-Republicans
Members of the Georgia House of Representatives
Georgia (U.S. state) state senators
Mayors of Savannah, Georgia
United States Attorneys for the District of Georgia
Georgia (U.S. state) lawyers
American slave owners
American militiamen in the War of 1812

United States senators who owned slaves